Bartlett Yancey House is a historic home located in Yanceyville, Caswell County, North Carolina.  It consists of a two-story L-shaped Greek Revival block added to the front of the original Federal house in 1856. The original section was built around 1810.  It features a Victorian overlay of front and side porches added late 19th century.  Also on the property are the original smokehouse, a Federal
period law office, several log tobacco barns, and the Yancey family graveyard.  It was the home of Congressman Bartlett Yancey (1785-1828).

It was added to the National Register of Historic Places in 1973.

References

Houses on the National Register of Historic Places in North Carolina
Federal architecture in North Carolina
Greek Revival houses in North Carolina
Houses completed in 1856
Houses in Caswell County, North Carolina
National Register of Historic Places in Caswell County, North Carolina